The Armoured Brigade is a Finnish Army training unit located in Parolannummi, near Hämeenlinna, in southern Finland. The brigade specialises in training armoured and anti-aircraft troops. In case of mobilization, the Finnish Defence Forces would field one armoured brigade. The war-time armoured brigade has a strength of around 5,700 men, and fields 63 main battle tanks, 110 infantry fighting vehicles, circa 100 armoured personnel carriers, mainly of Soviet origin, and roughly 70 other armoured vehicles. However, the remaining war-time armoured brigade is being phased out and replaced by smaller mechanized battle groups. The new mechanized battle groups will field the Leopard 2 MBTs that are not included in the organization of the contemporary war-time armoured brigades.

Organisation 
Since Finnish Defence Forces reform in 2015, the structure of the Armoured Brigade is the following:

 Häme Armoured Battalion (HämPsP, Hämeen Panssaripataljoona)
 Military Police Company (SpolK, Sotilaspoliisikomppania)
 Tank Company (PsvK, Panssarivaunukomppania)
 Armoured Jäger Company (PsJK, Panssarijääkärikomppania)
 Armoured Pioneer Company (PsPionK, Panssaripioneerikomppania)
 Helsinki Anti-Aircraft Regiment (HelItR, Helsingin Ilmatorjuntarykmetti)
 Command Post Battery (Johtokeskuspatteri)
 Armoured Anti-Aircraft Battery (Panssari-ilmatorjuntapatteri)
 1st & 2nd Anti-Aircraft Missile Batteries (1. & 2. Ohjusilmatorjuntapatteri)
 NCO School (Aliupseerikoulu)
 Jäger Artillery Regiment (JTR, Jääkäritykistörykmentti)
 Armoured Signals Company (PSVIESTIK, Panssariviestikomppania)
 Self-Propelled Howitzer Battery (PsHPtri, Panssarihaupitsipatteri)
 Mortar Company (KrhK, Kranaatinheitinkomppania)
 Command & Control Company (JoJäK, Johtamisjärjestelmäkomppania) (Merged with Armoured Signals Company in December 2021)
 Parola Supply Battalion (ParHP, Parolan Huoltopataljoona)
 Truck Company (Autokomppania)
 Logistics Company (Huoltokomppania)
 Conscript Band of the Finnish Defence Forces (Puolustusvoimien Varusmiessoittokunta)
 Logistics Centre (Huoltokeskus)
 Electronic Warfare Center (Elektronisen sodankäynnin keskus)

The Armoured Band (Panssarisoittokunta) was disbanded in 2013 as part of the FDF reform. After disbandment of the Military Music School and the Häme Regiment, the Conscript band was attached to the Armoured Brigade. Following the disbandment of the Signals Regiment in 2014, the Center of Electronic Warfare was attached to the brigade. The Armoured School, which trains reserve officers and career personnel, was attached to the Army Academy in 2015.

Training equipment 
 Leopard 2A4 including Leopard 2R demining vehicle and Leopard 2L Bridge layer
 BMP-1 (Ex-East German, fully withdrawn from service, except Forward Observation variants BMP1TJ and BMP1 TTJ)
 BMP-2 (Operational, acquired from East-German surplus stocks)
 Marksman (Self-propelled anti-aircraft gun)
 Crotale NG - (Crotale NGs on Sisu XA-181 vehicles, designated ItO 90)
 Buk M1 known as ItO 96, Anti-aircraft missile transporter erector launcher
 2S1 known as 122 PsH 74 (122 Panssarihaupitsi 74, 122mm armoured howitzer 74)
 2S5 known as 152 TelaK 91 (152 Telakanuuna 91, 152mm tracked cannon 91)
 MT-LBV Armoured personnel carrier
 MT-LBu Artillery command vehicle
 BTR-50 YVI Tracked signals vehicle
 T-72 Ex-East German, fully withdrawn from service. Used as target dummies.

External links 
Armoured Brigade
Organisation table at official Finnish Defence Force site

References

Brigades of Finland
Hattula
Armoured brigades